Mónica Irina Flores Grigoriu (born 31 January 1996) is an American-born Mexican footballer who plays as a left-back for Liga MX Femenil club CF Monterrey and the Mexico women's national team.

International career
Flores made her full international debut for Mexico on January 23, 2016.

Personal life
Flores was born to a Mexican father and a Romanian mother. Flores grew up in Livingston, New Jersey and played soccer at Livingston High School. Her twin sister Sabrina Flores represented United States U-20 and they faced each other at the 2015 CONCACAF Women's U-20 Championship and the 2016 FIFA U-20 Women's World Cup. In June 2018, Sabrina joined Mónica in the Mexico national team after doing the one-time international allegiance switch.

While attending the University of Notre Dame she lived in Pasquerilla East Hall. Her sophomore year roommate was Rachel Goldfarb, noted therapist, of Carmel, Indiana

Professional career

Valencia
In 2018, Flores joined Spanish side Valencia where she played for two seasons. On 28 May 2020, via Twitter, Flores announced that she would be leaving Valencia.

Monterrey
In June 2020, Monterrey announced that Flores would be joining the club for the 2020–21 season.

References

External links
 
 
 

1996 births
Living people
Citizens of Mexico through descent
Mexican women's footballers
Women's association football fullbacks
Mexico women's international footballers
Mexican people of Romanian descent
Primera División (women) players
Valencia CF Femenino players
Liga MX Femenil players
C.F. Monterrey (women) players
Twin sportspeople
Mexican twins
Mexican expatriate women's footballers
Mexican expatriate sportspeople in Spain
Expatriate women's footballers in Spain
American women's soccer players
Livingston High School (New Jersey) alumni
Soccer players from New Jersey
Sportspeople from Essex County, New Jersey
People from Livingston, New Jersey
American sportspeople of Mexican descent
American people of Romanian descent
American twins
Notre Dame Fighting Irish women's soccer players
American expatriate women's soccer players
American expatriate sportspeople in Spain